Cuniculina is a genus of phasmids belonging to the family Phasmatidae.

The species of this genus are found in Madagascar.

Species:

Cuniculina cunicula 
Cuniculina insignis 
Cuniculina obnoxia 
Cuniculina stilpna

References

Phasmatidae
Phasmatodea genera